Chow Wai-keung (born ca. 1957) is a Hong Kong social worker and politician. He was an elected member of the Central and Western District Board and the Urban Council of Hong Kong in the 1980s and 1990s.

Chow was born in Hong Kong in around 1957. He grew up in Central. He was graduated from the Baptist College and was a core member of the Hong Kong Social Workers' General Union. He was first elected to the Central and Western District Board in Central in the first District Board elections in 1982. He was among the first politicians to demand for increased democracy in the 1980s and welcomed the government's Green Paper: the Further Development of Representative Government in Hong Kong.

Chow was re-elected in 1985 but resigned after he was elected to the Urban Council of Hong Kong in 1986. In the capacity of the Urban Council for Central and Western District he returned to the Central and Western District Board as ex officio member. He was re-elected to the Urban Council uncontestedly in 1989. In 1991, he represented the United Democrats of Hong Kong to run in the 1991 District Board elections. He retired from politics when he stepped down from the District Board in 1994.

References

1957 births
Living people
Members of the Urban Council of Hong Kong
District councillors of Central and Western District
Alumni of Hong Kong Baptist University
Hong Kong social workers
United Democrats of Hong Kong politicians
Democratic Party (Hong Kong) politicians
Hong Kong Affairs Society politicians